This is a list of the main career statistics of former Australian tennis player Evonne Goolagong Cawley. During her career, which lasted from 1967 to 1983, Goolagong won seven singles titles at a Grand Slam event and was a runner-up in 11 occasions. In addition, she won five Grand Slam doubles titles, partnering Margaret Court, Peggy Michel and Helen Gourlay, as well as one mixed doubles title with Kim Warwick. In total she won 84 singles titles, 53 doubles titles and 6 mixed doubles titles. She achieved the No. 1 singles ranking for a two-week period in April–May 1976, although this was only officially recognized in 2007. She was a member of the Australian Federation Cup teams that won the cup in 1971, 1973 and 1974.

Major finals

Grand Slam finals

Singles: 18 finals (7 titles, 11 runners-up)

Women's doubles: 6 finals (5 titles, 1 runner-up)

Note:  The shared women's doubles title at the Australian Open in 1977 (December) isn't traditionally counted in Goolagong's win total because the finals were never played.  Otherwise, she would have 14 Grand Slam titles, 6 Grand Slam women's doubles titles, and 7 Grand Slam women's doubles finals.

Mixed doubles: 2 finals (1 title, 1 runner-up)

Year-End Championships finals

Singles: 3 finals (2 titles, 1 runner-up)

Grand Slam singles tournament timeline

Note: The Australian Open was held twice in '77, in January and December.  Goolagong won the December edition. She was seeded #4 for the 1980 US Open Championships, but withdrew from the tournament before play began.

Career titles (Open Era) 
The Open Era began on 22 April 1968.

Singles (84 titles)

Doubles (53 titles) 

 *Due to bad weather, the 1976 Australian Open doubles final was played for one special set.
 Most Titles w/ Doubles Partners:
   10 w/ Patricia Edwards
    7 w/ Margaret Court
    7 w/ Peggy Michel
    6 w/ Helen Gourlay
    6 w/ Janet Young

Mixed doubles (6 titles)

 5 November 1970 - Australian Hardcourt Championships (w/Bob Giltinan) defeated Patricia Edwards and Ross Case 6-2, 7-5
 4 June 1972 - French Open (w/Kim Warwick) defeated Françoise Dürr and Jean-Claude Barclay 6-2 6-4
 14 January 1973 - New Zealand Open (w/Ross Case) defeated Janet Young and Dick Crealy 6-1, 6-3
 27 November 1973 - South African Open (w/Jurgen Fassbender) defeated Ilana Kloss and Bernard Mitton 6-3 6-2
 19 January 1974 - New Zealand Hard Court Championships (w/Russell Simpson) defeated Sue Barker and John Lloyd 6-3, 6-4
 11 October 1980 - Hilton Head, SC, World Couples Championships (w/Stan Smith) defeated Andrea Jaeger and Dick Stockton 7-5 6-4

Federation Cup
Goolagong played in 26 ties in the then-named Federation Cup between 1970 and 1982. Of the seven years she played, the Australian team won in three: 1971, 1973 and 1974. She accumulated a total of 35 wins over her career, which ties with Margaret Court and Dianne Balestrat as the third-most ever from an Australian. She holds a 22–3 singles record and a 13–2 record in doubles.

Wins (3)

Tournament Results
(Championship wins in bold)

1966 (Won 0 of 2 tournaments)
New South Wales Open, Sydney AUS: 3RD Lost Gail Sheriff 2-6 3-6
South Australian Championships, Adelaide AUS: 3RD Lost Nancy Richey 1-6 0-6

1967 (Won 0 of 6 tournaments)
Manly, Australia: Quarter Final Lost Betty Stöve 5-7 ?-?
Australian Championships, Adelaide: 3RD Lost Kerry Melville 0-6 2-6
Sydney Metro, AUS: Quarter Final Lost Karen Krantzke 6-2 2-6 2-6
Queensland Grass Courts, Brisbane AUS: TBD
New South Wales Open, Sydney AUS: TBD
Victorian Championships, Melbourne AUS: TBD

1968 (Won 1 of 7 tournaments)
Manly, AUS: 2RD Lost Blackman 5-7 5-7
Australian Championships, Melbourne AUS: 3RD Lost Margaret Court 3-6 1-6
New South Wales Hardcourt Championships, Woliongong AUS: Final Lost Fenton 6-4 4-6 5-7
Sydney Metropolitan Hardcourt Championships, AUS: Champion. F d. Wendy Gilchrist 6-1 6-3
Queensland Hardcourt Championships, Brisbane AUS: TBD
Australian Hardcourt Championships: Final Lost Karen Krantzke 1-6 1-6
Queensland Grass Championships, Brisbane AUS: Quarter Final Lost Lesley Bowrey 5-7 2-6

1969 (Won 2 of 11 tournaments)
Tasmanian Championships, Hobart AUS: Quarter Final Lost Lesley Bowrey 3-6 2-6
Victorian Championships, Melbourne AUS: 2RD Lost Helen Gourlay 4-6 4-6
New South Wales Open, Sydney AUS: 2RD Lost Ann Jones 2-6 1-6
Australian Open Championships, Melbourne AUS: 2RD Lost Billie Jean King 3-6 1-6
New South Wales Hardcourt Championships, Cowra AUS: Champion. F d. Wendy Gilchrist 6-4 6-2
Sydney Metro, AUS: Final Lost Patricia Coleman 6-1 4-6 0-6
National Capital Championships, Canberra AUS: Champion. F d. Patricia Coleman 6-4 6-1
Metropolitan Grass Court Championships, Sydney AUS: Final Lost Karen Krantzcke 3-6 4-6
Australian Hardcourt Championships, Sydney AUS: Quarter Final Lost Christina Sandberg 6-2 6-8 4-6
Queensland Hardcourt Championships, Toowoomba, AUS: Final Lost Christina Sandberg 6-3 2-6 2-6
Queensland Grass Championships, Brisbane AUS: Quarter Final Lost Kerry Harris 5-7 2-6

1970 (Won 15 of 33 tournaments)
Manly Seaside Cup, Sydney AUS: Champion. Final d. Karen Krantzcke 6-2 4-6 6-1 
Victorian Championships, Melbourne AUS: 1RD Lost Kerry Melville 1-6 0-6
Tasmanian Championships, Hobart AUS: 2RD Lost Lesley Hunt 4-6 0-6
New South Wales Hardcourt Championships, Newcastle AUS: Champion. F d. Karen Krantzcke 6-1 5-7 6-3
Australian Open Championships, Melbourne AUS: Quarter Final Lost Margaret Court 6-3 6-1
Dunlop Open, Sydney AUS: 1RD Lost Françoise Dürr 2-6 3-6
Southport, UK: Champion. F d. Joyce Williams 6-2 6-3
Stalybridge, UK: Final Lost Joyce Williams 5-7 8-6 3-6
Poole En Tout Cas, Dorset UK: Final Lost Joyce Williams 2-6 0-6
Cumberland (or Hampstead?), UK: Champion. Final d. Jill Cooper 6-2 9-7 
Sutton, UK: 3RD Lost Ann Jones 6-4 3-6 4-6
British Hardcourt Championships, Bournemouth UK: Final Lost Margaret Court 1-6 4-6
Surrey Hardcourt Championships, Guildford UK: Quarter Final Lost Gail Chanfreau 1-6 4-6
Bio-Strath London Hardcourt Championships , Hurlingham UK: Semi Final Lost Ann Jones 6-3 3-6 5-7
Surbiton, UK: Quarter Final Lost Joyce Williams 7-9 4-6
Rothman's Northern Championships, Manchester UK: 3RD Lost Kristy Pigeon 2-6 6-1 2-6
Rothman's Kent Championships, Beckenham UK: Quarter Final Lost Patti Hogan 2-6 0-6
Queen's Club, London UK: 1RD Lost Townsend 2-6 6-1 5-7
Wimbledon Championships, London UK: 2RD Lost Jane Bartkowitz 4-6 0-6
Wimbledon All England Plate Trophy, London UK: Champion. F d. Lita Liem 6-2 6-1
Welsh Open Championships, Newport UK: Champion. F d. Patti Hogan 6-0 8-6
Hoylake, UK: Champion. F d. Kerry Melville 2-6 6-2 6-1
Green Shield Midland Open, Leicester UK: Champion. F d. Patti Hogan 6-2 6-2
Dutch Open Championships, Hilversum NED: Quarter Final Lost Margaret Court 2-6 2-6
Bavarian Open, Munich GER: Champion. F d. Karen Krantzcke 6-2 6-1
German Open Championships, Hamburg: Final Lost Helga Niessen 3-6 3-6
Kitzbuhel, AUT: Final Lost Helga Niessen 5-7 3-6
Eastern Suburb Hardcourt Championships, AUS: Champion. F d. Ann Coleman 6-2 6-0
Sydney Metro Grass Court Championships, AUS: Champion. F d. Patricia Coleman 6-3 6-1
Queensland Hardcourt Championships, AUS: Champion. F d. Patti Ann Reese 6-3 3-6 6-4
Australian Hardcourt Championships, Toowoomba: Champion. F d. Marilyn Tesch 6-3 7-5
Queensland Grass Court Championships, Brisbane AUS: Champion. F d. Kristien Kemmer 6-3 6-2
Metro Hard Court Championships, Sydney AUS: Champion. F d. Ann Coleman

1971 (Won 12 of 29 tournaments)
Western Australia Championships, Perth: 2RD Lost Betty Stöve 6-8 2-6
New South Wales Open Championships, Sydney AUS: 2RD Lost Betty Stöve 4-6 6-3 5-7
Victorian Championships, Australia: Champion. F d. Margaret Court 7-6 7-6
New Zealand Championships, Auckland: Champion. F d. Betty Stöve 6-1 6-4
Benson & Hedges Championships, Auckland, NZ: Final lost Margaret Court 6-3 6-7 2-6
New South Wales Hardcourt Championships, Tamworth AUS: Champion. F d. Patti Hogan 6-1 6-4
Australian Open, Melbourne: Final lost Margaret Court 6-2 6-7 5-7
Natal Open Championships, Durban RSA: Quarter Final Lost Orth 6-2 5-7 4-6
South Africa Open, Johannesburg: Final lost Margaret Court 3-6 1-6
Rothman's Championships, Sutton UK: Champion. F d. Joyce Williams 7-5 2-6 6-3
Rothman's Surrey Hardcourt Championships, Guildford UK: Champion. F d. Jill Cooper 6-4 6-3
Bio-Strath London Hardcourt Championships, Hurlingham UK: 3RD Lost Judy Dalton (3 sets)
British Hard Court Championships, Bournemouth: Final lost Margaret Court 5-7 1-6
French Open Championships, Paris: Champion. F d. Helen Gourlay 6-3 7-5
JP Four-Woman Round Robin Championship, Nottingham UK: Final Lost Margaret Court 4-6 0-6
Wimbledon, UK: Champion. F d. Margaret Court 6-4 6-1
Carroll's Irish Open, Dublin: Final lost Margaret Court 3-6 6-2 3-6
North of England Championships, Hoylake: Quarter Final Lost Patti Hogan 0-6 6-4 2-6
Green Shield Midland Championships, Leicester UK: Champion. F d. Patti Hogan 6-2 6-4
Dutch Open Championships, Hilversum: Champion. F d. Christina Sandberg 8-6 6-3
Rothman's Canadian Open Championships, Toronto: Final Lost Françoise Dürr 4-6 2-6
Dewar Cup, Edinburgh UK: Champion. F d. Françoise Dürr 6-0 6-3
Dewar Cup, Billingham UK: Semi Final Lost Julie Heldman 0-6 7-5
Embassy British Indoor Championships, London: Semi Final Lost Françoise Dürr 4-6 4-6
Dewar Cup, Aberavon UK: Final Lost Virginia Wade 6-7 3-6
Dewar Cup, Torquay UK: Final Lost Françoise Dürr 6-1 4-6 3-6
Dewar Cup Championships, London UK: Semi Final Final Julie Heldman 0-6 6-0 1-6
Queensland Grass Court Championships, AUS: Champion. F d. Helen Gourlay 6-2 7-6
Australian Hardcourt Championships, Brisbane AUS: Champion. F d. Mona Schallau 1-6 1-6

1972 (Won 13 of 23 tournaments)
Australian Open Championships, Melbourne: Final Lost Virginia Wade 4-6 4-6
New South Wales Open, Sydney AUS: Champion. F d. Virginia Wade 6-1 7-6
South Australia Championships, Adelaide AUS: Champion. F d. Olga Morozova 7-6 6-3
Western Australia Championships, Perth AUS: Champion. F d. Olga Morozova 6-2 7-5
New South Wales Hardcourt Championships, Sydney AUS: Champion. TBD
Maureen Connolly International (Virginia Slims), Dallas TX USA: Semi Final Lost Billie Jean King 6-1 3-6 4-6
South African Open, Johannesburg: Champion. F d. Virginia Wade 4-6 6-3 6-0
Rothman's British Hardcourt Championships, Bournemouth UK: Champion. F d. Helga Masthoff 6-0 6-4
Rothman's Surrey Hardcourt Championships, Guildford UK: Champion. F d. Joyce Williams 7-5 6-2
French Open Championships, Paris FRA: Final Lost Billie Jean King 3-6 3-6
JP Four-Woman Round Robin Championship, Nottingham UK: Group d. Rosie Casals 6-3 7-5 / Lost Virginia Wade 7-6 4-6 5-7
WD & HO Wills Cup, Bristol UK: Semi Final Lost Kerry Melville 8-9 6-2 2-6
Wimbledon Championships, London UK: Final Lost Billie Jean King 3-6 3-6
Carroll's Irish Open, Dublin IRE: Champion. Final d. Pat Pretorius 2-6 6-1 6-2
Rothman's North of England Championships, Hoylake UK: Champion. F not played. Title split with Betty Stöve
Western Open Championships, Cincinnati OH USA: Final Lost Margaret Court 6-3 2-6 5-7
US Clay Court Championships, Indianapolis IN USA: Final Lost Chris Evert 6-7 1-6
Rothman's Canadian Open Championships, Toronto CAN: Champion. F d. Virginia Wade 6-3 6-1
US Open Championships, New York USA: 3RD Lost Pam Teeguarden 5-7 1-6
Australian Hardcourt Championships, Melbourne AUS: Champion. F d. Patricia Coleman 6-7 6-2 6-2
Queensland Grass Court Championships, Brisbane AUS: Champion. F d. Glynis Coles 6-0 7-5
Western Australia Championships, Perth AUS: Final Lost Margaret Court 3-6 2-6
South Australia Championships, Adelaide AUS: Champion. F d. Kerry Harris 6-1 6-2

1973 (Won 13 of 29 Tournaments)
Australian Open Championships, Melbourne. Final Lost Margaret Court 6-4 7-5
New South Wales Grass Court Championships, Sydney AUS: Final Lost Margaret Court 6-4 3-6 8-10
New Zealand Championships, Chirstchurch: Champion. F d. Janet Young 7-6 6-2
Auckland Championships, NZ: Champion. F d. Marilyn Pryde 6-0 6-1
New South Wales Hardcourt Championships, Sydney AUS: Champion. F d. Dianne Fromholtz 
S & H Green Stamp Classic, Ft. Lauderdale, FL USA: Semi Final Lost Virginia Wade 6-7 3-6
Maureen Connolly International (Virginia Slims), Dallas TX USA: Final Lost Virginia Wade 4-6 1-6
US Women's Indoor Championships, Hingham MA: Champion. F d. Virginia Wade 6-4 6-4 
Akron Open, OH USA: 1RD Lost Marita Redondo 3-6 5-7
Sarasota Open, FL USA: Final Lost Chris Evert 3-6 2-6
Miami Beach Women's Pros, FL USA: Final Lost Chris Evert 6-3 3-6 2-6
St Petersburg Masters, FL USA: Final Lost Chris Evert 2-6 6-0 4-6
British Hard Court Championships, Bournemouth UK: Final Lost Virginia Wade 4-6 4-6
French Open Championships, Paris FRA: Semi Final Lost Margaret Court 3-6 6-7
Italian Open Championships, Rome ITA: Champion. F d. Chris Evert 7-6 6-0
Mercedes Benz Open, Lee-On-Solent UK: Champion. F d. Pat Pretorius 6-3 6-2
Rothman's Championships, Queen's Club London UK: Final Lost Olga Morozova 2-6 3-6
Wimbledon Championships, London UK: Semi Final Lost Billie Jean King 3-6 7-5 3-6
Düsseldorf Open, GER: Final Lost Helga Masthoff 4-6 4-6
Head Austrian Open Championships, Kitzbuhel: Champion. F not played. Title split with Olga Morozova
Czech International Championships, Prague: Champion. F d. Renata Tomanova 6-3 6-3
Western Championships, Cincinnati OH USA: Champion. F d. Chris Evert 6-2 7-5
Canadian Open Championships: Champion. F d. Helga Masthoff 7-6 6-4
US Open Championships, New York USA: Final Lost Margaret Court 5-7 7-5 2-6
Four Roses Classic, Charlotte NC USA: Champion. F d. Eugenia Birioukova 6-2 6-0
Osaka Open, Japan. TBD
Japan Open, Tokyo. Champion. F d. Helga Masthoff 7-6 6-3
South African Open, Johannesburg. Final Lost Chris Evert 6-3 6-3
West Australia Championships, Perth: Champion. F d. Kerry Harris 7-5 6-1

1974 (Won 7 of 18 tournaments)
Australian Open Championships, Melbourne: Champion. F d. Chris Evert 7-6 4-6 6-0
New South Wales Open, Sydney AUS: Final Lost Karen Krantzcke 2-6 3-6
New Zealand Grass Court Championships, Auckland. Champion. F d. Ann Kiyomura 6-2 6-1
New Zealand Hardcourt Championships, Whangerei: Champion. F d. Margaret Michel 6-4 6-4
Virginia Slims Sarasota, FL USA: Final Lost Chris Evert 6-4 6-0
Virginia Slims St. Petersburg, FL USA: Semi Final Lost Kerry Melville 5-7 4-6
Virginia Slims Philadelphia, PA USA: 2RD Lost Helen Gourlay 3-6 6-3 6-7
Family Circle Cup, Hilton Head SC USA: Semi Final Lost Kerry Melville 3-6 6-3 6-4
Wimbledon Championships, London UK: Quarter Final Lost Kerry Melville 7-9 6-1 2-6
US Open Championships, New York USA: Final Lost Billie Jean King 6-3 3-6 5-7
Virginia Slims Denver, CO USA: Champion. F d. Chris Evert 7-5 3-6 6-4
Virginia Slims Houston, TX USA: Final Defaulted Chris Evert
Virginia Slime Philadelphia, PA USA: 1RD Lost Wendy Overton 
Virginia Slims Championships, Los Angeles CA USA: Champion. Final d. Chris Evert 6-3 6-4
World Invitational Classic, Hilton Head USA: Semi Final Lost Chris Evert 6-2 6-1
Queensland Grass Court Championships, AUS: Champion. F d. Pam Doerner 6-1 6-2
South Australia Championships, Adelaide AUS: Semi Final Lost Olga Morozova 2-6 6-3 6-8
New South Wales Championships, Sydney AUS: Champion. F d. Margaret Court 6-3 7-5

1975 (Won 4 of 19 tournaments)
Australian Open, Melbourne AUS: Champion. F d. Martina Navratilova 6-3 6-2
New Zealand Open, Auckland: Champion. F d. Linda Mottram 6-2 7-5
Virginia Slims Chicago, IL USA: Quarter Final Lost Wendy Overton 3-6 4-6
Virginia Slims Detroit, MI USA: Champion. F d. Margaret Court 6-3 3-6 6-3
Virginia Slims Boston, MA USA: Final Lost Martina Navratilova 2-6 6-4 3-6
Virginia Slims Houston, TX USA: Semi Final Lost Chris Evert 6-4 4-6 6-7
Virginia Slims Dallas, TX USA: Semi Final Lost Martina Navratilova 6-3 3-6 2-6
Virginia Slims Philadelphia, PA USA: Quarter Final Lost Virginia Wade 4-6 0-6
Virginia Slims Championships, Los Angeles CA USA: Semi Final Lost Chris Evert 1-6 4-6 / 4th Place Lost Virginia Wade 5-8
L'eggs Four Women World Series, Austin TX USA: Semi Final Lost Billie Jean King / 3rd Place d. Olga Morozova 2‐6 6‐3 6‐3
Family Circle Cup, Amelia Island USA: Semi Final Lost Chris Evert 1-6 1-6
Wimbledon Championships, London UK: Final Lost Billie Jean King 0-6 1-6
US Open Championships, New York NY: Final Lost Chris Evert 7-5 4-6 2-6
World Invitational Classic, Hilton Head Island USA: Final Lost Chris Evert 1-6 1-6
US Indoor Championships, Charlotte NC USA: Final Lost Martina Navratilova 6-4 2-6 5-7
French Indoor Championships, Paris. Quarter Final Lost Sue Barker 2-6 5-7
Dewar Cup, London UK: Final Lost Virginia Wade 3-6 2-6
Dewar Cup, Perth AUS: Final Lost Virginia Wade 3-6 1-6
New South Wales Open, Sydney AUS: Champion. F d. Sue Barker 6-2 6-4

1976 (Won 8 of 14 tournaments)
Australian Open, Melbourne AUS: Champion. F d. Renata Tomanova 6-3 6-2
L'eggs World Series, Austin TX USA: Final Lost Chris Evert 3-6 2-6
Virginia Slims Chicago, IL USA: Champion. F d. Virginia Wade 3-6 6-4 6-2
Virginia Slims Akron, OH USA: Champion. F d. Virginia Wade 6–2 3–6 6–2
Virginia Slims Sarasota, FL USA: Final Lost Chris Evert 3-6 0-6
Virginia Slims San Francisco, CA USA: Final Lost Chris Evert 5-7 6-7
Virginia Slims Dallas, TX USA: Champion. F d. Martina Navratilova 6-1 6-1
Virginia Slims Boston, MA USA: Champion. F d. Virginia Wade 6-2 6-0
Virginia Slims Philadelphia, PA USA: Champion. F d. Chris Evert 6-3 7-6
Virginia Slims Championships, Los Angeles CA USA: Champion. F d. Chris Evert 6-3 5-7 6-3
Wimbledon, London UK: Final Lost Chris Evert 3-6 6-4 6-8
US Open, New York USA: Final Lost Chris Evert 3-6 0-6
World Invitational Tennis Classic, Hilton Head Island USA. Champion. F d. Virginia Wade 6-3 6-4
Colgate New South Wales Championships, Sydney AUS: Quarter Final Lost Dianne Fromholtz

1977 (Won 4 of 6 tournaments)
Player's Canadian Open, Toronto QB: First Round Lost Katja Ebbinghaus 4-6 7-5 4-6
World Invitational Tennis Classic, Hilton Head, USA: Final Lost Virginia Wade 3-6 7-6 3-6 / 3rd Place d. Kerry Reid 6-4 7-6
Colgate International, Sydney AUS: Champion. F d. Kerry Melville Reid 6-1 6-3
Toyota Classic, Melbourne AUS: Champion. F d. Wendy Turnbull 6-4 6-1
Marlboro New South Wales Open, Sydney AUS: Champion. F d. Sue Barker 6-2 6-3
Australian Open, Melbourne: Champion. F d. Helen Gourlay Cawley 6-3 6-0

1978 (Won 6 of 12 tournaments)
Virginia Slims Hollywood, FL USA: Champion. F d. Wendy Turnbull 6-2 6-3
Virginia Slims Chicago, IL USA: Final Lost Martina Navratilova 7-6 2-6 2-6
Virginia Slims Detroit, MI USA: Quarter Final Lost Dianne Fromholtz 2-6 1-6
Virginia Slims Kansas, MO USA: Quarter Final Lost Billie Jean King 2-6 3-6
Virginia Slims Dallas, TX USA: Champion. F d. Tracy Austin 4-6 6-0 6-2
Virginia Slims Boston, MA USA: Champion. F d. Chris Evert 4-6 6-1 6-4
Virginia Slims Championships, Oakland CA USA: Final Lost Martina Navratilova 7-6 6-4
Surrey Grass Court Championship, Surbiton UK: Champion. F d. Winnie Wooldridge 6-1 6-1
Kent Championships, Beckenham UK: Champion. F d. Laura DuPont 6-4 6-2
Keith Prowse International, Chichester UK: Champion. F d. Pam Teeguarden 6-4 6-4
Wimbledon, London UK: Semi Final Lost Martina Navratilova 6-2 4-6 4-6
Emeron Cup, Tokyo Japan: Group Lost Martina Navratilova 3-6 2-6 / Lost Virginia Wade 6-7 4-6
Goolagong entered both the Virginia Slims Seattle and the Florida Federal tournaments, but withdrew before any matches were played.

1979 (Won 4 of 13 tournaments)
Family Circle Cup, Amelia Island, USA: Semi Final Lost Tracy Austin 0-6 1-6
Italian Open, Rome, Italy: Semi Final Lost Sylvia Hanika 5-7 6-3 5-7
German Open, W Berlin: Semi Final Lost Regina Maršíková 2-6 6-3 3-6
Crossley Carpets Trophy, Chichester, UK: Champion. F d. Sue Barker 6-1 6-4
Kentish Times Championships, Beckenham, UK: Champion. F d. Pam Shriver 6-3 6-2
Wimbledon, UK: Semi Final Lost Chris Evert 3-6 2-6
US Clay Court Championships, Indianapolis: Final Lost Christ Evert 4-6 3-6
US Open Championships, New York: Quarter Final Lost Chris Evert 5-7 2-6
Toray Sillook Open, Tokyo, Japan: Final Lost Billie Jean King 4-6 5-7
Davison's Tennis Classic (Virginia Slims), Atlanta USA: Semi Final Lost Martina Navratilova 1-6 3-6
US Indoor Championships, Minneapolis USA: Champion. F d. Dianne Fromholtz 6-3 6-4
Florida Federal Open, Tampa USA: Champion. F d. Virginia Wade 6-0 6-3
Toyota Classic, Melbourne AUS: Defaulted R16 Mimi Wikstedt (not contested)

1980 (Won 1 of 15 tournaments)
Virginia Slims Washington DC, USA: Group Lost Martina Navratilova 3-6 2-6 / d. Regina Marsikova 6-1 6-1 / Lost Wendy Turnbull 1-2 (retired)
Virginia Slims Kansas City, MO USA: Quarter Final Lost Greer Stevens 6-7 1-6
Virginia Slims Chicago, Illinois USA: R16 Lost Sylvia Hanika 4-6 7-6 4-6
Avon Championships California, Oakland USA: Final Lost Martina Navratilova 1-6 6-7
Virginia Slims Detroit, Michigan USA: Final lost Billie Jean King 3-6 0-6
Virginia Slims Dallas, Texas USA: Final Lost Martina Navratilova 3-6 2-6
Avon Boston, Massachusetts, USA: 1RD Lost JoAnne Russell 6-4 5-7 1-6
Avon Championship Finals, New York USA: Semi Final lost Martina Navratilova 2-6 6-3 0-6
Clairol Crown, Carlsbad CA USA: Semi Final lost Tracy Austin 4-6 3-6 / 3rd Place d. Billie Jean King 6-0 6-3
Crossley Carpets Championships, Chichester UK: Final lost Chris Evert 3-6 7-6 5-7
Wimbledon, UK: Champion F d. Chris Evert 6-1 7-6
US Clay Court Championships, Indianapolis: Semi Final lost Andrea Jaeger 4-6 2-6
Player's Canadian Open Championships, Toronto QB. Quarter Final Lost Kathy Jordan 6-7 0-6
Lion Cup Japan: Group Lost Chris Evert 3-6 3-6 / Lost Tracy Austin 4-6 0-6
Australian Open, Melbourne: R32 Lost Mima Jausovec 2-6 6-4 4-6

1981 (Won 0 of 3 tournaments)
Perth Championships, Australia: R16 Lost Jane Preyer 3-6 3-6
Sydney Open, Australia: Quarter Final Lost Chris Evert 2-6 0-6
Australian Open, Melbourne: Quarter Final Lost Martina Navratilova 3-6 1-6

1982 (Won 0 of 9 tournaments)
Citizen Cup, Amelia Island FL USA: Semi Final Lost Chris Evert 7-5 1-6 4-6 / 3rd Place d. Hana Mandlikova 6-2 6-2
Family Circle Cup, Hilton Head SC USA: 1RD Lost JoAnne Russell 6-4 2-6 0-1 (retired)
Dow Classic, Edgbaston UK: R64 Lost Pam Teeguarden 4-6 6-2 3-6
Wimbledon, UK: R64 Lost Zina Garrison 4-6 2-6
Australian Indoor Championships, Sydney: Group Lost Chris Evert 3-6 1-6 / Lost Andrea Jaeger 4-6 1-6 / d. Sylvia Hanika 6-3 6-4
Australian Challenge International, Perth: 1RD Lost Andrea Jaeger 1-6 3-6
Brisbane Championships, Australia: R64 Lost Sue Barker 1-6 3-6
Sydney Open, Australia: Final lost Martina Navratilova 2-6 6-3 1-6
Australian Open, Melbourne: R32 Lost Candy Reynolds 6-2 4-6 5-7

1983 (Won 0 of 8 tournaments)
Marco Island Championships, Florida USA: R32 Lost Leigh Thompson 0-6 5-7
Virginia Slims Championships, New York USA: Group Lost Pam Shriver 1-6 3-6
Family Circle Cup, Hilton Head SC USA: R32 Lost Zina Garrison 5-7 3-6
Ponte Vedra Beach Championships, Florida USA: R16 Lost Raffaella Reggi 3-6 3-6
Italian Open, Rome: R32 Lost Christine Jolissaint 4-6 2-6
Swiss Open, Lugano: Quarter Final abandoned v Bettina Bunge
French Open, Paris: R32 Lost Chris Evert 2-6 2-6
Dow Classic, Edgbaston UK: R16 Lost Anne White 2-6 5-7

1985 (Won 0 of 1 tournament)
Australian Indoor Championships, Sydney: 1RD lost Amanda Tobin-Evans 3-6 2-6

Rivalries
Every Grand Slam singles champion from 1962-1986 was an active player at some point during Goolagong-Cawley's career. Of these eighteen other players (excluding Evonne herself), she never played a competitive singles match against either Maria Bueno or Karen Hantze-Susman. Of the other sixteen, she scored at least one victory over all these opponents throughout her career, with the exception of Ann Haydon-Jones. Jones won all three of their competitive matches from 1969 to 1971.

Head to head statistics of main rivals

Billie Jean King: Grand Slam Wins 1 - Losses 6. Total Career Wins 4 - Losses 13^.
Chris Evert: Grand Slam Wins 4 - Losses 6. Total Career Wins 13 - Losses 26.
1972 Wimbledon                      SF W   4-6, 6-3, 6-4
1972 Bonnie Belle Cup F    L 3-6, 6-4, 0-6
1972 Indianapolis, IN F    L 6-7, 1-6
1973 Sarasota, FL F    L 3-6, 2-6
1973 Miami Beach, FL F    L 6-3, 3-6, 2-6
1973 St. Petersburg, FL F    L 2-6, 6-0, 4-6
1973 Italian Open F    W 7-6, 6-0
1973 Bonnie Belle Cup RR W   6-4, 6-3
1973 Cincinnati, OH F    W 6-2, 7-5
1973 Johannesburg, South Africa F    L 3-6, 3-6
1974 Australian Open                F W   7-6, 4-6, 6-0
1974 Sarasota F    L 4-6, 0-6
1974 U.S. Open                      SF W   6-0, 6-7, 6-3
1974 Denver F    W 7-5, 3-6, 6-4
1974 Virginia Slims Championships F    W 6-3, 6-4
1974 Hilton Head, SC SF L   2-6, 1-6
1975 Boston, MA SF W   2-6, 6-4, 6-2
1975 Houston, TX SF L   6-4, 4-6, 6-7
1975 Virginia Slims Championships SF L   1-6, 4-6
1975 Amelia Island, FL SF L   1-6, 1-6
1975 U.S. Open                      F L   7-5, 4-6, 2-6
1975 Hilton Head, SC F    L 1-6, 1-6
1976 Austin, TX F    L 5-7, 1-6
1976 Sarasota, FL F    L 3-6, 0-6
1976 San Francisco F    L 5-7, 6-7
1976 Philadelphia F    W 6-3, 7-6
1976 Slims Championships/L.A. F W   6-3, 5-7, 6-3
1976 Wimbledon                      F L   3-6, 6-4, 6-8
1976 U.S. Open                      F L   3-6, 0-6
1978 Boston F    W 4-6, 6-1, 6-4
1979 Wimbledon                      SF L   3-6, 2-6
1979 Indianapolis F    L 4-6, 3-6
1979 U.S. Open                      QF L   5-7, 2-6
1980 Chichester, England F    L 3-6, 7-6, 5-7
1980 Wimbledon                      F W   6-1, 7-6
1980 Tokyo Lion (Emerson) Cup SF L   4-6, 0-6 
1981 Sydney, Australia QF L   2-6, 0-6
1982 Palm Beach Gardens SF L   7-5, 1-6, 4-6
1983 French Open                    3R L   2-6, 2-6
Virginia Wade: Grand Slam Wins 5 - Losses 1. Total Career Wins 30 - Losses 10.
Martina Navratilova: Grand Slam Wins 2 - Losses 2. Total Career Wins 12 - Losses 15.
1973 Hingham, Mass., USA 1R W   6-4 6-4
1973 Sarasota, Fla., USA 1R W   6-2 6-1
1973   French Open                  QF W   7-6 6-4
1973 Bratislava, Czechoslovakia SF W   6-3 7-5
1973 Charlotte, N.C., USA SF W   6-2 6-3
1975   Australian Open              F W   6-3 6-2
1975 Detroit, USA SF W   7-6 6-3
1975 Boston, USA F    L 2-6 6-4 3-6
1975 Dallas, USA SF L   6-3 3-6 2-6
1975 Federation Cup F    L 3-6 4-6
1975 Charlotte, N.C., USA F    L 6-4 2-6 5-7
1976 Chicago, USA SF W   7-6 6-2
1976 Sarasota, Fla., USA SF W   6-4 6-1
1976 Dallas, USA F    W 6-1 6-1
1976 Virginia Slims Championships RR W   6-4 7-5
1978 Chicago, USA F    L 7-6 2-6 2-6
1978 Boston, USA SF W   7-6 7-6
1978 Virginia Slims Championships F    L 6-7 4-6
1978   Wimbledon                    SF L   6-2 4-6 4-6
1978 Tokyo, Japan 1R L   3-6 2-6
1979 Atlanta, USA SF L   1-6 3-6
1980 Colgate Series Championships RR L   3-6 2-6
1980 Oakland, Calif., USA F    L 1-6 6-7
1980 Dallas, USA F    L 3-6 2-6
1980 Avon Championships SF L   2-6 6-3 0-6
1981   Australian Open              QF L   3-6 1-6
1982 Sydney, Australia F    L 0-6 6-3 1-6
Rosie Casals: Grand Slam Wins 2 - Losses 0. Total Career Wins 12 - Losses 1.
Margaret Court: Grand Slam Wins 2 - Losses 6. Total Career Wins 4 - Losses 16^.
Tracy Austin: Grand Slam Wins 1 - Losses 0. Total Career Wins 4 - Losses 4.
Sue Barker: Grand Slam Wins 1 - Losses 0. Total Career Wins 7 - Losses 2.
Wendy Turnbull: Grand Slam Wins 1 - Losses 0. Total Career Wins 5 - Losses 0.
Francoise Durr: Grand Slam Wins 2 - Losses 0. Total Career Wins 3 - Losses 0.
Helen Gourlay: Grand Slam Wins 4 - Losses 0. Total Career Wins 5 - Losses 0^.
^Incomplete data available.

Notes

References

External links 
 
 
 
 

Tennis career statistics